Automolis is a genus of moths in the family Erebidae erected by Jacob Hübner in 1819.

Species
 Automolis aurantiifusa (Rothschild, 1913)
 Automolis bicolora (Walker, 1856)
 Automolis crassa (Felder, 1874)
 Automolis fuliginosa (Kiriakoff, 1953)
 Automolis incensa (Walker, 1864)
 Automolis meteus (Stoll, 1781)
 Automolis pallida (Hampson, 1901)
 Automolis subulva (Mabille, 1884)

References

External links

Syntomini
Moth genera